Sant Domí is a hamlet located in the municipality of Sant Guim de Freixenet, in Province of Lleida province, Catalonia, Spain. As of 2020, it has a population of 27.

Geography 
Sant Domí is located 81km east of Lleida.

References

Populated places in the Province of Lleida